
Gmina Rzekuń is a rural gmina (administrative district) in Ostrołęka County, Masovian Voivodeship, in east-central Poland.

Villages
Gmina Rzekuń contains the villages and settlements of Borawe, Czarnowiec, Daniszewo, Drwęcz, Dzbenin, Goworki, Kamianka, Korczaki, Laskowiec, Ławy, Nowa Wieś Wschodnia, Nowe Przytuły, Nowy Susk, Ołdaki, Przytuły Stare, Rozwory, Rzekuń, Stary Susk, Teodorowo, Tobolice and Zabiele, Stacja.

Neighbouring gminas
Gmina Rzekuń is bordered by the city of Ostrołęka and by the gminas of Czerwin, Goworowo, Lelis, Miastkowo, Młynarze, Olszewo-Borki and Troszyn.

References

Polish official population figures 2006

Rzekun
Ostrołęka County